The Three Stooges Meet Hercules is a 1962 American comedy fantasy film directed by Edward Bernds. It is the third feature film to star the Three Stooges after their 1959 resurgence in popularity. By this time, the trio consisted of Moe Howard, Larry Fine, and Joe DeRita (dubbed "Curly Joe"). Released by Columbia Pictures, The Three Stooges Meet Hercules was directed by long-time Stooges director Edward Bernds. It was the most financially successful of the Stooges' feature films.

Plot 
The Stooges work at Dimsal's Drug Store in Ithaca, New York, where they befriend their eccentric next-door neighbor Schuyler Davis (Quinn Redeker), who is attempting to build a time machine. With the boys' "help", the machine transports the boys, Schuyler and disaffected girlfriend Diane Quigley (Vicki Trickett) back in time to Ithaca in ancient Greece during the reign of the lecherous King Odius (George N. Neise). The King, after defeating and imprisoning Ulysses because the Stooges are believed to be gods, has a yearning for Diane. Realizing they have disrupted the proper course of history, Schuyler and the boys free Ulysses, after which Odius banishes them to the galleys. However, the constant rowing causes Schuyler to become extremely muscular and superhumanly strong, equal to Hercules.

After an escape and shipwreck, they kill a monster Siamese  Cyclops with the help of Joe's sleeping pills and start billing Schuyler as Hercules at a local gladiatorial arena. The real Hercules (Samson Burke) gets wind of their game and confronts them, but after single combat, Schuyler convinces Hercules to help them rescue Diane in a chariot chase. The time travelers remove Odius and, navigating by observing the progress of military technology, manage to set history straight by dumping him off into the Wild West where a tribe of American Indian warriors chases him off into the distance. After that, the travelers return to Dimsal's Drug Store. Dimsal touches the time machine and disappears, but eventually returns locked inside a pillory.

Cast

Production notes
The Three Stooges Meet Hercules was filmed over 13 days on June 6–22, 1961. The film marked the return of director Edward Bernds, who had worked with Stooges during the Shemp Howard era and was recruited to help revive several proven routines from the past. Bernds later commented, "The team wasn't the same. They were older and I had to remind myself to be careful with them. I didn't want them to have a heart attack in the middle of a scene. If they had to run up a flight of stairs, I'd cut to something and jump to them at the top of the stairs." Bernds also commented on working with new third Stooge, Joe DeRita: "[Joe DeRita] wasn't quite the typical Stooge, he wasn't quite as willing to be hurt as Curly was or even Shemp. And Moe was very considerate of him and Joe DeRita was a little temperamental and didn't like to be hurt. Moe took pains to make sure that Joe wasn't hurt the way Larry was, for instance, or the way Shemp used to be. He didn't get slapped as much. We had to use doubles more for Joe DeRita than we did Shemp or Curly."

Injury
Larry Fine sustained an injury that landed him in Cedars-Sinai Medical Center when filming a scene that involved climbing aboard a parked chariot. The 300-pound DeRita lost his grip and fell directly on top of Fine, knocking him unconscious. Fine was rushed to the hospital and quickly discharged when deemed fit enough to return to work. It was during Fine's brief hospital stay that he was diagnosed with Type 2 diabetes, which he controlled by resisting foods containing sugar for the remainder of his life (Fine died in January 1975).

Reception
Moe Howard expressed his fondness for the film in 1973, stating "Of course Hercules I liked very much. Especially when we were in the slave ship. We had a great special effects team on that."

See also 
 List of American films of 1962

References

External links 
 
 
 
 The Three Stooges Meet Hercules at threestooges.net
 

1962 films
1960s fantasy comedy films
American fantasy comedy films
American black-and-white films
Columbia Pictures films
1960s English-language films
Films based on classical mythology
Films about time travel
The Three Stooges films
Films directed by Edward Bernds
American slapstick comedy films
Films scored by Paul Dunlap
Films about Heracles
1962 comedy films
1960s American films